The Grundig Team Trophy was a women's professional golf tournament on the Swedish Golf Tour played annually from 1989 until 1991. It was always held at Royal Drottningholm Golf Club in Stockholm, Sweden.

The 36-hole best ball tournament made its debut in 1989 and was immediately popular with the players. 

Pia Nilsson and Hillewi Hagström successfully defended their title in 1990 in very wet conditions.

Amateurs Annika Sörenstam and Maria Bertilsköld were runner-ups at the final tournaments, one stroke behind winners Marie Wennersten-From and Viveca Hoff.

Winners

References

Swedish Golf Tour (women) events
Golf tournaments in Sweden
Defunct sports competitions in Sweden
Recurring sporting events established in 1989
Recurring sporting events disestablished in 1991